Coelostathma parallelana is a species of moth of the family Tortricidae. It is found on the Virgin Islands, Cuba and Hispaniola.

The larvae feed on Acacia farnesiana.

References

Moths described in 1897
Sparganothini